Awad Khleifat (born 1945) is a Jordanian politician who served as the Hashemite Kingdom of Jordan's deputy prime minister and interior minister from October 2012 to late March 2013.

Early life and education
Khleifat was born in Wadi Musa in the Petra region in 1945. He holds a PhD in history, which he received from SOAS, University of London.

Career
Khleifat served as chairman of Mutah University from 1989 to 1991. Then he joined politics, and served as a member of the upper house several times. He also served in different Jordanian cabinets. One of his cabinet positions was minister of higher education. He was also deputy prime minister. In addition, Khleifat served as interior minister several times, for instance, in 1996. He was also appointed interior minister in June 2000 to the cabinet of Ali Abu Ragheb. His term ended in January 2002, and he was replaced by Qaftan Al Majali. Khleifat was appointed by King Abdullah II to the upper house of parliament on 17 November 2003. King Abdullah II appointed Khleifat to the royal committee on 31 January 2006. On 17 December 2009, he was again appointed to the upper house of parliament on 17 December 2009.

Khleifat was again appointed interior minister and also, deputy prime minister to the cabinet led by Abdullah Ensour formed on 11 October 2012. His term ended on 30 March 2013 and Hussein Majali replaced him as interior minister in the cabinet reshuffle. The post of deputy prime minister was not filled in the reshuffle.

Personal life
Khleifat awarded the Kawkab Medal of the First Order and the Istiqlal Medal of the First Order.

References

1945 births
Living people
Alumni of SOAS University of London
Deputy prime ministers of Jordan
Academic staff of Mutah University
Heads of universities in Jordan
Interior ministers of Jordan